Thomas C. Hanks is an American seismologist. He works for the US Geological Survey (USGS) in Menlo Park, California.  Dr. Hanks is a member of the Seismological Society of America, the American Geophysical Union, the Earthquake Engineering Research Institute, the Geological Society of America, the Peninsula Geological Society at Stanford, and many related geological societies.  Dr. Hanks has authored dozens of scholarly papers in strong-motion seismology and tectonic geomorphology.

In 1979 the Japanese-American seismologist Hiroo Kanamori, professor of seismology at the California Institute of Technology and Dr. Hanks  suggested the use of Moment magnitude scale to replace the Richter magnitude scale for measuring the relative strength of earthquakes.  The reason was that the Richter scale saturates at magnitudes greater than about 5.5, while the Moment magnitude scale does not saturate.

Hanks graduated with a B.S.E. in geological engineering from Princeton University in 1966 after completing a senior thesis titled "The meaning of a heat flow experiment on Mars." He later received his PhD from the California Institute of Technology in 1972 after completing a dissertation titled "A Contribution to the Determination and Interpretation of Seismic Source Parameters".

References

External links
"Quake Watcher" Princeton Alumni News profile on Hanks

American seismologists
Fellows of the Seismological Society of America
Princeton University School of Engineering and Applied Science alumni
Year of birth missing (living people)
Living people
California Institute of Technology alumni